Elton John: The Classic Years (known in North America as Elton John: The Remasters) was a remastering series of English musician Elton John's albums, in which some of the albums included bonus tracks (that some of them) are previously appeared on compilations like Rare Masters and the box set To Be Continued.... 

The first series of albums (which were also released in a limited edition velvet box, bearing John's signature) was released in 1995 and included:
 Empty Sky
 Elton John
 Tumbleweed Connection
 17-11-70
 Madman Across the Water
 Honky Château
 Don't Shoot Me I'm Only the Piano Player
 Goodbye Yellow Brick Road
 Caribou
 Captain Fantastic and the Brown Dirt Cowboy
 Rock of the Westies
 Here and There

The second part of the series was released in 1998, and included:
 Blue Moves
 A Single Man
 Too Low for Zero
 Ice on Fire
 Live in Australia with the Melbourne Symphony Orchestra
 Reg Strikes Back
 Sleeping with the Past
 The One

Victim of Love, 21 at 33, The Fox, Jump Up! and Breaking Hearts were eventually remastered and re-released on their own accord in 2003. Leather Jackets, long touted by John as his least favorite album, was never remastered, and last appeared on CD in 1992. It would later be released digitally in 2007.

Bonus track listing
Empty Sky
"Lady Samantha"
"All Across the Havens"
"It's Me That You Need"
"Just Like Strange Rain"

Elton John
"Bad Side of the Moon"
"Grey Seal" (Original version)
"Rock and Roll Madonna"

Tumbleweed Connection
"Into the Old Man's Shoes"
"Madman Across the Water" (original version)

Honky Château
"Slave" (Alternate take)

Don't Shoot Me I'm Only the Piano Player
"Screw You (Young Man's Blues)"
"Jack Rabbit"
"Whenever You're Ready (We'll Go Steady Again)"
"Skyline Pigeon" (Piano version)

Caribou
"Pinball Wizard"
"Sick City"
"Cold Highway"
"Step into Christmas"

Captain Fantastic and the Brown Dirt Cowboy
"Lucy in the Sky with Diamonds"
"One Day at a Time"
"Philadelphia Freedom"

Rock of the Westies
"Don't Go Breaking My Heart" (with Kiki Dee) [UK/Europe only]
"Planes" [US only]
"Sugar On The Floor" [US only]

A Single Man
"Ego"
"Flinstone Boy"
"I Cry at Night"
"Lovesick"
"Strangers"

Too Low for Zero
"Earn While You Learn"
"Dreamboat"
"The Retreat"

Ice on Fire
"The Man Who Never Died"
"Restless" (Live 1984)
"Sorry Seems to Be the Hardest Word" (Live 1977) (Erroneously listed as "Live 1984")
"I'm Still Standing" (Live 1984)

Reg Strikes Back
"Rope Around a Fool"
"I Don't Wanna Go On with You Like That" (Shep Pettibone Mix)
"I Don't Wanna Go On with You Like That" (Just Elton and His Piano Mix)
"Mona Lisas and Mad Hatters, Part Two" (The Renaissance Mix)

Sleeping with the Past
"Dancing in the End Zone"
"Love Is a Cannibal"

The One
"Suit of Wolves"
"Fat Boys and Ugly Girls"

References

1995 compilation albums
Elton John compilation albums